Henry Edmund Donnelly (August 28, 1904 – November 4, 1967) was an American Bishop of the Catholic Church. He served as an auxiliary bishop of the Archdiocese of Detroit from 1954 to 1967.

Biography
Born in Hudson, Michigan, Henry Donnelly was ordained a priest for the Archdiocese of Detroit on August 17, 1930.  On September 6, 1954 Pope Pius XII appointed him as the Titular Bishop of Tymbrias and Auxiliary Bishop of Detroit.  He was consecrated a bishop by Cardinal Edward Mooney on October 26, 1954. The principal co-consecrators were Bishop Allen Babcock of Grand Rapids and Detroit auxiliary bishop Alexander M. Zaleski.  He continued to serve as an auxiliary bishop until his death on November 4, 1967, at the age of 63.

References

1904 births
1967 deaths
People from Hudson, Michigan
Roman Catholic Archdiocese of Detroit
20th-century American Roman Catholic titular bishops